Plamen Penev (born 8 February 1994) is a Bulgarian footballer who plays as a forward for Vereya Stara Zagora.

References 

1994 births
Living people
Bulgarian footballers
Association football forwards
First Professional Football League (Bulgaria) players
OFC Sliven 2000 players
PFC Beroe Stara Zagora players